is a Japanese actress and fashion model. She has starred in several TV dramas and movies, including the 2004 horror film Tokyo Psycho.

Biography
Kokubu was married in 2011 and had her first child in 2016.

Filmography
 Nurse no osigoto 3 (TV, 2000)
 Onmyoji (2001)
 Tokyo Psycho (2004)

References

Japanese television personalities
Japanese female models
1976 births
Living people
Actresses from Tokyo
Keisen University alumni